The family name Reagan, and its cognates Regan, O'Regan, O Regan, O'Reagan, is an Anglicized form of the Irish surname Ó Riagáin or Ó Ríogáin, from Ua Riagáin. The meaning is likely to originate in ancient Gaelic from ri "sovereign, king" and the diminutive -in, "the king's child", transliterating as "little king" 

The feminine forename Regan is likely to have derived sometime later from the English royal name Regina.

Notable people with the surname include:

Jimmy Reagan (1891–1975), American boxer who won the World Bantamweight Championship. 
Ronald Reagan (1911–2004), 40th president of the United States
Nancy Reagan (1921–2016), wife of Ronald Reagan and First Lady from 1981 to 1989
Maureen Reagan (1941–2001), President Reagan's daughter from his first marriage to Jane Wyman
Michael Reagan (born 1945), President Reagan's adopted son and radio talk show host
Patricia Ann Reagan (born 1952), better known as Patti Davis, Ronald and Nancy Reagan's daughter 
Ron Reagan (born 1958), President Reagan's son and journalist 
Frank Reagan (1919–1972), American football player
John Henninger Reagan (1818–1905), Confederate politician 
Johnny Reagan (1926–2018), American college baseball coach
Lisa Reagan, American singer 
Marc Reagan, NASA Station Training Lead and NEEMO underwater program Mission Director
Michael Joseph Reagan (born 1954), American judge
Michele Reagan (born 1969), Secretary of State of Arizona
Ron Reagan (Florida politician) (born 1954), American politician

References

Surnames of Irish origin

Surnames from given names